Claudio Barigozzi (1909 – 5 August 1996) was an Italian biologist and geneticist.

Barigozzi taught genetics at the University of Milan in 1948, and was a scholar of the transmission of hereditary traits using Drosophila and  Artemia as model organisms.

An adviser of the Centro Lombardo per l'incremento della Orto-floro-frutticoltura in Minoprio, Italy, he promoted genetic research as a member of the Italian National Research Council's committee for the study of genetics in 1961, of the scientific board of the National Genetics Centre in Rome in 1963, and other Italian and foreign academies. His more proficient pupils include the geneticists Ercole Ottaviano, Giuseppe Gavazzi, and Alessandro Camussi.

References

 Mechanisms of Speciation: Proceedings from the International Meeting on Mechanisms of Speciation, Accademia Nazionale Dei Lincei. 
 Origin and Natural History of Cell Lines: Proceedings of a Conference, Held at Accademia Nazionale Dei Lincei, Rome, Italy, October 28–29, 1977. 
  Vito Volterra Symposium on Mathematical Models in Biology: Proceedings of a Conference Held at the Centro Linceo Interdisciplinare, Accademia Naziona, Springer Verlag. 
 Giornata Lincea Nella Ricorrenza Del Centenario Della Riscoperta Delle Leggi Di Mendel: In Ricordo Di Claudio Barigozzi, Adriano Buzzati Traverso, Francesco D'Amato and Giuseppe Montalenti (Rome, 9.11.2000) Francesco D'Amato, Adriano A. Buzzati-Traverso, Claudio Barigozzi, Giuseppe Montalenti; Accademia Nazionale Dei Lincei. 
 Manipolazioni Genetiche ed Etica Cattolica (in collaboration with Carlo Caffarra, Luigi De Carli), Piemme. 

1909 births
1996 deaths
20th-century Italian biologists
Italian geneticists
Scientists from Milan